Dowlatabad (also Romanized as Dowlatābād; also known as Daulatābad, Dowlatābād Arzoo’eyeh, Dowlatābād-e Arzū’tābād, and Dowlatābād Esfandaqeh) is a village in Arzuiyeh Rural District, in the Central District of Arzuiyeh County, Kerman Province, Iran. At the 2006 census, its population was 2,462, in 578 families.

References 

Populated places in Arzuiyeh County